Midland High School is a public, magnet high school located in Midland, Michigan. It is the older of two high schools in the Midland Public Schools district, and a member of the Saginaw Valley High School Association.

Academics

IB Diploma
Midland participate in the International Baccalaureate Diploma Programme.

Athletics 
The Chemics currently compete in the Saginaw Valley League.

Midland High School Gymnasium was used as the home arena by the Flint Dow A.C.'s professional basketball team during the 1947–48 season. They played in the National Basketball League, the major pro league of the era before it merged with the BAA to form the modern NBA.

Notable alumni
 Terry Collins, MLB manager (New York Mets, Anaheim Angels, Houston Astros)
 Alden B. Dow (1904–1983), architect
 Paul Emmel, MLB umpire
 Cathy Guisewite, (born 1950) cartoonist who created the comic strip Cathy in 1976
 Larry Jaster, former MLB player (St. Louis Cardinals, Montreal Expos, Atlanta Braves)
 Jim Kern, former MLB pitcher (Cleveland Indians, Milwaukee Brewers)
 Kevin Mahar, former MLB player (minor league of the Texas Rangers)
 Andrew Maxwell, football player for Michigan State University
 Howard Mudd, (died 2020) 3-time Pro Bowl offensive guard for the San Francisco 49ers; long-time NFL assistant coach
 Andrew Wylie (Class of 2012), offensive tackle for the Kansas City Chiefs

References

External links

Public high schools in Michigan
Midland, Michigan
Educational institutions established in 1872
Schools in Midland County, Michigan
1872 establishments in Michigan
National Basketball League (United States) venues
Flint Dow A.C.'s